Lacticaseibacillus manihotivorans is a starch-hydrolysing lactic acid bacterium first isolated during Cassava sour starch fermentation (common practise in parts of Africa and Asia). It is Gram-positive, catalase-negative, non-spore-forming, non-motile rod-shaped and homofermentative, with type strain OND 32T.

References

Further reading
Ljungh, Åsa, and Torkel Wadström, eds. Lactobacillus molecular biology: from genomics to probiotics. Horizon Scientific Press, 2009.

External links

LPSN
Type strain of Lactobacillus manihotivorans at BacDive -  the Bacterial Diversity Metadatabase

Lactobacillaceae
Bacteria described in 1998